Lou is a 2017 American computer-animated short film written and directed by Dave Mullins and  produced by Pixar. It was theatrically released alongside Pixar's Cars 3 on June 16, 2017. The film is about a lost-and-found box and the unseen monster within. It was nominated for the Academy Award for Best Animated Short Film at the 90th Academy Awards.

Plot
The lost-and-found box in a kindergarten playground is home to Lou, a creature made from the assorted unclaimed items (whose name is made up of three letters missing from the sign on the box). After each recess period, Lou picks up the toys and items kids have left behind, leaving them in the box and subtly encouraging their owners to find them when they return.

A bully named J.J. starts stealing toys from the other children and putting them in his backpack. Lou is angered by this and decides to take J.J.'s backpack once J.J is the last kid on the playground. J.J catches him in the act and a chase ensues, with Lou constantly changing his shape to avoid being caught.

During the chase, Lou notices the name tag on J.J.'s underwear matches the name tag on a toy in the bottom of the box, an old plushie dog that a bigger kid had stolen from J.J. some years before. Lou shows the dog to J.J, but refuses to give it to him until J.J. not only returns the toys he stole but also helps find the owners of every single item in the box. J.J. initially returns the toys begrudgingly, but is surprised when a girl gratefully hugs him. He begins to enjoy returning the remaining items, making some new friends in the process. Returning to the box for the last time, J.J. finds that Lou is no longer present, as all of his parts have been claimed by their owners. J.J. sees his plushie dog is the last toy left and happily reclaims it. A football lands near him and he decides to join two other boys for a game of catch.

Reception

Lou premiered at the South by Southwest festival on March 12, 2017. It was theatrically released on June 16, 2017, together with Pixar's eighteenth film Cars 3.

The film is dedicated to Mullins' father, who died during the making of the short.

Awards

References

External links

2017 films
2017 3D films
2017 computer-animated films
2010s Disney animated short films
Animated films without speech
Films scored by Christophe Beck
Pixar short films
3D animated short films